The 1989 Virginia Slims of Arizona was a women's  tennis tournament played on outdoor hard courts in Phoenix, Arizona in the United States and was part of the Category 2 tier of the 1989 WTA Tour. It was the fourth edition of the tournament and was held from September 12 through September 18, 1989. First-seeded Conchita Martínez won the singles title and earned $17,000 first-prize money.

Finals

Singles
 Conchita Martínez defeated  Elise Burgin 3–6, 6–4, 6–2
 It was Martínez' 3rd singles of the year and the 4th of her career.

Doubles
 Penny Barg /  Peanut Louie Harper defeated  Elise Burgin /  Rosalyn Fairbank 7–6(16–14), 7–6(7–3)

See also
 1989 Eagle Classic – men's tournament in Scottsdale

References

External links
 ITF tournament edition details
 Tournament draws

Virginia Slims of Arizona
Virginia Slims of Arizona
Virginia Slims of Arizona
Virginia Slims of Arizona